The long-nosed echymipera (Echymipera rufescens), or long-nosed spiny bandicoot, is a species of marsupial in the family Peramelidae. It is found in Australia, Indonesia, and Papua New Guinea. Its natural habitat is subtropical or tropical dry forests.

Vernacular names
Vernacular names for E. rufescens in various Aru languages of the Aru Islands in far eastern Indonesia:

Ujir: koa
Kola: koyi
Dobel: ʔosi
Batuley: koyi
Manumbai: kagaran
Goda-Goda: kawaran
Lorang: kagwaran
Koba: ngarukwabala
West Tarangan: man

References

External links
Image at ADW

Peramelemorphs
Marsupials of New Guinea
Marsupials of Australia
Mammals of Papua New Guinea
Mammals of Western New Guinea
Mammals of Queensland
Least concern biota of Oceania
Mammals described in 1875
Taxa named by Wilhelm Peters
Taxonomy articles created by Polbot